This is a list of Olympians that have won at least three gold medals in one event. It includes top-three placings in 1896 and 1900, before medals were awarded for top-three placings. Medals won in the 1906 Intercalated Games are not included. The Olympics listed for each athlete only include games when they won medals in the specified event.

Individual events

Notes
(*): Non-consecutive gold medals
Aleksandr Medved representing Soviet Union won three gold medals in Wrestling. His first gold medal at 1964 Olympics was in Light Heavyweight (97 kg) division while his gold medals at 1968 and 1972 were in Heavyweight (+97 kg/+100 kg) division.
Irina Rodnina representing Soviet Union won three gold medals in figure skating with two different partners. In 1972 she competed with Alexei Ulanov, in 1976 and 1980 with Alexander Zaitsev.
Kakhi Kakhiashvili representing Georgia  in the Unified Team in 1992 Olympics and Greece in 1996 and 2000 Olympics won three gold medals in Weightlifting. While his 1992 gold medal was won in the 90 kg division (fourth heaviest), 1996 gold medal was won in the 99 kg division (third heaviest; the 91 kg event was also held) and 2000 gold medal in the 94 kg division (third heaviest).
Chris Hoy representing Great Britain won six gold medals, and one silver, in cycling. His first gold at the 2004 Olympics was in the 'kilo', the one kilometre time trial. This event was removed from the Games shortly afterwards, and replaced with the mass-start keirin sprint event. Hoy proceeded to win consecutive golds in this new event in 2008 and 2012.
On 5 April 2017 it was announced that as a result of retesting samples Artur Taymazov had been disqualified from the 2008 Olympics for a drug violation, and his gold medal withdrawn. On 23 July 2019 it was announced that as a result of retesting samples he had been disqualified from the 2012 Olympics for a drug violation, and his gold medal from that event also withdrawn.

Team events

Team events, consecutive titles

Team events, consecutive, identical team

See also
List of multiple Olympic gold medalists
List of multiple Olympic gold medalists at a single Games
List of multiple Olympic medalists in one event
List of medal sweeps in Olympic athletics
List of multiple Paralympic gold medalists
All-time Olympic Games medal table

References

External links